Air Arabia Maroc is a Moroccan low-cost airline, set up as a joint venture between various Moroccan investors and Air Arabia. Its head office is located in the Arrivals Terminal of Mohammed V International Airport in Nouaceur Province, Morocco in Greater Casablanca.

History
Air Arabia Maroc was founded as a partnership between Air Arabia, Regional Air Lines and Ithmaar Bank. The low-cost carrier was officially launched on 29 April 2009, and started operations on 6 May the same year, with its maiden flight serving the Casablanca–London Stansted route. Radiating from Casablanca, the first destinations served were Brussels, London, Marseille, Milan and Paris. In  the same year, Jason Bitter —former CEO of SkyEurope— was appointed Air Arabia Maroc's CEO.

In October 2019, Air Arabia Maroc unveiled plans to shut down it base at Agadir–Al Massira Airport and close several routes in the same month.

Destinations

Fleet

The Air Arabia Maroc fleet consists of the following aircraft (as of September 2019):

See also
List of airlines of Morocco
Transport in Morocco

References

External links

Official website

2009 establishments in Morocco
Airlines of Morocco
Airlines established in 2009
Low-cost carriers